Mohabbat Ab Nahi Hogi English: Love will be no longer is a 2014 Pakistani romantic drama serial that airs on Hum TV every Monday and Tuesday at 9:10 pm./PST. It is written by Saima Akram Chaudhry and produced by MD Productions of Gem Stones. It stars Armeena Rana Khan, Ali Rehman Khan, Syed Jibraan Ali, Laila Zuberi and Sundas Khan in pivot roles. The show tops the ratings chart with 5.12 TRP's reaching at position no one and followed by Shikwa and Khata with 3.8 and 2.8 TRP's respectively.

Cast

Syed Jibran Ali as Arham
 Ali Rehman Khan as Aazar
 Sundas Khan as Urooj
 Armeena Rana Khan as Fiza
 Zainab Qayyum as Uzma
 Zarnish Khan as Madhia
 Laila Zuberi as Arham's mother
 Nargis Rasheed as Fiza's Mother
 Anjum
 Habibi
 Sift Chaudhry
 Sofia
 Tariq Abdullah
 Alamdaar Khan

Soundtrack

Muhabbat Ab Nahi Hugi OST is sung by Momin Durani, while lyrics were penned down by Sabir Zafar and music composed by Shebi of MadMusic.

Accolades

Drama receives following nomination at 2015 Hum Awards:

References

External links 
 official website
 
 Hum Tv's Mohabbat Ab Nahe Ho Gi official page

Pakistani drama television series
2014 Pakistani television series debuts
Pakistani telenovelas